Mikael Blixt (born 8 August 1964) is a former speedway rider from Sweden.

Speedway career 
Blixt rode in the top tier of British Speedway during the  1982 British League season, riding for the Poole Pirates. He returned nine years later to compete in the 1991 British League season for the Berwick Bandits.

He stood as reserve for the final of the Speedway World Championship in the 1991 Individual Speedway World Championship following a successful qualification through the Nordic final and his high placing in the World semi final.

He won the silver medal in 1989 at the Swedish Championship.

References 

1964 births
Living people
Swedish speedway riders
Berwick Bandits riders
Peterborough Panthers riders
Poole Pirates riders
People from Nyköping Municipality
Sportspeople from Södermanland County